The 1898 Geneva Covenanters football team was an American football team that represented Geneva College as an independent during the 1898 college football season. Led by second-year head coach Ross Fiscus, Geneva compiled a record of 0–6–1.

Schedule

References

Geneva
Geneva Golden Tornadoes football seasons
College football winless seasons
Geneva Covenanters football